Jaswal is a village and union council, an administrative subdivision, of Khushab
 District]] in the Punjab Province of Pakistan. It is part of Khushab

 .

References

Union councils of Chakwal District
Populated places in Chakwal District